<div style="text-align: justify;">List of rulers of Wanga Kingdom in Kenya.
Though the Wanga kingdom king's list actually starts from the re-known founder Wanga, some researchers date them back to the old Egyptian kings time where they were under the leadership of Makata. They assert  that through their migration, they passed through many places such as Cameroon, Ethiopia where they were under the leadership of Simbi and Nangwera. While in Uganda they were ruled by several Buganda kings such as Muteesa, Kamaanyi, Mwanga (also Muwanga), Mbwoli (also Mbwoti), Muwanga II. Later, Wamoyi settled in Ibanda in Samia (Uganda), and Muwanga III, his son, migrated to Lela in Nyanza Kenya around the 10th century. The children of Muwanga III were Khabiakala, Wamoyi, Wanga, Wekhoba, Mukoya, Mutende and Sakwa. They all dispersed to different regions to search for a better place to live.

Muwanga III's son called Sakwa migrated to Bondo along the Lake Victoria basin. The other son Mutende, migrated southwards and settled in Kuria. The other four sons: Wamoyi, Wanga, Wekhoba and Mukoya moved to Tiriki after being invited by a cousin of them called Mukolwe who had settled earlier in Maragoli. 

It is related that later, Wanga secretly moved towards the West alone and arrived in a place called Imanga in South Wanga in Mumias West sub-county. Nakhisa in his research mentions a list of kings who ruled the Wanga as follows:
{| class="wikitable"
Name of Nabongo (King)
Time of reign 
Notes
|-
|Muteesa
|342 - 445
|
|-
|Kamaanyi
|445 - 535
|
|-
|Muwanga
|535 - 645
|
|-
|Mbwoti 
|645 - 740
|
|-
|Muwanga II
|740 - 860
|
|-
|Wamoyi 
|860 - 950
|
|-
|Muwanga III
|950 - 1050
|
|-
|Wanga
|1050 - 1140
|Foundation of the Kingdom of Wanga
|-
|Wabala
|1140 - 1190
|
|-
|Musuwi
|1190 - 1274
|
|-
|Chibwire
|1274 - 1354
|
|-
|Musindalo
|1354 - 1464
|
|-
|Chitechi
|1464 - 1554
|
|-
|Netya
|1554 - 1617
|
|-
|Osundwa
|1617 - 1717
|
|-
|Wamukoya
|1717 - 1797
|
|-
|Shiundu
|1797 -1880
|
|-
|Mumia
|1880 - 1949
|Significant historic figure, ruled during the colonial period.
|-
|Shitawa
|1949 - 1980
|
|-
|Peter Mumia II
|1980 to present
|
|}

References 

Wanga, Rulers
Wanga
Wanga